Eric Wright may refer to:

 Eric Wright (cornerback, born 1959), American football cornerback
 Eric Wright (cornerback, born 1985), American football cornerback
 Eric Wright (wide receiver) (born 1969), American football wide receiver
 Eric Wright (writer) (born 1929), Canadian writer of mystery novels
 Eric Lloyd Wright (born 1929), American architect
 Eazy-E (born Eric Lynn Wright, 1964–1995), American rapper, producer, and record executive
 Eric William Wright (1919–2007), Battle of Britain RAF officer
 Eric Wright (footballer) (born 1980), Liberian footballer
 Eric Joseph Wright (1912–1979), Australian general practitioner, medical administrator and public servant

See also
 Erik Olin Wright (born 1947), sociologist